The 2012 Italian Figure Skating Championships was held in Courmayeur from December 15 through 18, 2011. Skaters competed in the disciplines of men's singles, ladies' singles, pair skating, ice dancing, and synchronized skating on the senior and junior levels. The results may be used to choose the teams to the 2012 World Championships, 2012 European Championships, and 2012 World Junior Championships.

Senior results

Men

Ladies

Pairs

Ice dancing

Synchronized

Junior medalists

Men

Ladies

Pairs

Ice dancing

Synchronized

External links
 2012 Italian Championships results at the FISG

Italian Figure Skating Championships
2011 in figure skating
Figure Skating Championships, 2012
Sport in Courmayeur